Saroj Sonkar is an Indian politician from Bhartiya Janata Party. She won the Balha Assembly constituency in 2019 by-election and again in 2022.

References 

Year of birth unknown
Living people
Bharatiya Janata Party politicians from Uttar Pradesh
Uttar Pradesh MLAs 2017–2022
Indian Hindus
Year of birth missing (living people)
Uttar Pradesh MLAs 2022–2027